Ahti Karjalainen's first cabinet was the 47th government of Republic of Finland. Cabinet's time period was from April 13, 1962 to December 18, 1963. It was a majority government. Social Democratic Union of Workers and Smallholders left the government in October 1963.

Karjalainen, 1
1962 establishments in Finland
1963 disestablishments in Finland
Cabinets established in 1962
Cabinets disestablished in 1963